D
This is a list of justices of the Minnesota Supreme Court.

Following is a list of persons who have served on various incarnations of the Minnesota Supreme Court. For a list of chief justice see List of chief justices of Minnesota.

Territorial Supreme Court justices
Justices of the Minnesota Territorial Supreme Court.

*-Chief Justice †-Elected ‡-Served as Chief Justice, but confirmation rejected by U.S. Senate

All justices
Following is a list of all justices of the Minnesota Supreme Court. Chief Justice terms are in bold.

References

Minnesota law
Minnesota lawyers
Chief Justices of the Supreme Court
Chief Justices
Chief Justices of the Minnesota Supreme Court
 
Minnesota